Cardet is a commune in the Gard department in southern France.

Geography

Climate

Cardet has a hot-summer Mediterranean climate (Köppen climate classification Csa).

Population

See also
 Altar frontal from Cardet
Communes of the Gard department

References

Communes of Gard